Robert de Vere, 5th Earl of Oxford (c. 1220 – 1296) was the son and heir of Hugh de Vere, 4th Earl of Oxford, and chamberlain to Queen Eleanor.

Early life
Robert de Vere was born about 1220, the only son of Hugh de Vere, 4th Earl of Oxford, and Hawise de Quincy, daughter of Saer de Quincy, 1st Earl of Winchester. He had three sisters, Isabel, Lora and Margaret.

Career
Robert de Vere's marriage brought into his family the role of chamberlain to Henry III's queen Eleanor. He was among the followers of Simon de Montfort during the Second Barons' War, and was with Simon's son, Simon the Younger, when Edward I of England attacked Kenilworth Castle prior to the Battle of Evesham. De Vere's title and property were forfeited, but restored shortly afterwards by the Dictum of Kenilworth.

Marriage and issue
Before 22 February 1252, he married Alice de Sanford, daughter and heiress of Gilbert de Sanford. They had six sons and two daughters:
Robert de Vere, 6th Earl of Oxford, who married Margaret de Mortimer, daughter of Roger Mortimer, 1st Baron Mortimer
Sir Hugh de Vere, who married Denise de Munchensy, daughter and heiress of Sir William de Munchensy of Swanscombe, Kent
Sir Alphonse de Vere, who married Jane Foliot, daughter of Sir Jordan Foliot, Lord Foliot, and by her was the father of John de Vere, 7th Earl of Oxford
Thomas de Vere
Gilbert de Vere, a cleric
Philip de Vere, a cleric
Joan de Vere, who married Sir William de Warenne
Hawise de Vere

Death
Robert de Vere died before 7 September 1296. His widow, Alice, died at Canfield, Essex on 7 September 1312. They were both buried at Earls Colne, Essex. The heart of Robert de Vere was buried separately at the Ipswich Greyfriars, which was the burial place of Margaret Mortimer, wife of the 6th Earl.

Footnotes

References

External links
 Inquisition Post Mortem #367, dated 24 Edw. I.

1220 births
1296 deaths
Year of birth uncertain
Robert de Vere, 5th Earl
Robert
13th-century English people